WinX DVD Ripper Platinum is a Windows-based DVD ripping program for copying and transcoding DVD discs, disc images or simple file copies from a DVD. Conversion is possible into multiple common video/audio formats and it is also capable of removing DVD copy protection. It is developed by Digiarty Software Inc.

See also
 DVD-Video
 DVD ripper
 Blu-ray ripper
 HandBrake
 Comparison of DVD ripper software
 Comparison of video converters

References

External links
 

DVD rippers
Multimedia software